was a village located in Tsukubo District, Okayama Prefecture, Japan.

As of 2003, the village had an estimated population of 5,563 and a density of 585.58 persons per km2. The total area was 9.50 km2.

On March 22, 2005, Kiyone, along with the village of Yamate (also from Tsukubo District), was merged into the expanded city of Sōja.

Dissolved municipalities of Okayama Prefecture